HMS Atheling (D51) was a Royal Navy Ruler-class escort carrier of the Second World War. She was a US built ship provided under lend lease and returned to the US at the end of hostilities.

History

She was built by the Seattle-Tacoma Shipbuilding Corporation (Tacoma, Washington) under Maritime Commission Contract. She was launched 7 September 1942, sponsored by Mrs. Richard P. Luker. The ship was commissioned on 12 July 1943 as USS Glacier AVG-33 under the command of Commander Ward C. Gilbert.  Her designation was changed to CVE-33 on 15 July 1943. Final work was carried out at  US Navy Yard Puget Sound in July and she was transferred to the Royal Navy on 31 July 1943 at Vancouver, British Columbia

Following formal transfer the ship was sent to the Royal Canadian Navy dockyard at Esquimalt for conversion for British use. Following the work she was commissioned as Atheling on 28 October. She sailed via the Panama Canal and New York arriving at the Clyde UK in January 1944 and underwent further modification there to operate fighter aircraft.

Atheling ferried RN squadrons to the Far East in April 1944: 822 NAS and 823 NAS with their Fairey Barracudas at Madras on 11 April and 1837 NAS and 1838 NAS (Vought Corsair II) disembarked at Ceylon on 13 April, 

At Trincomalee Atheling took on 1383 NAS and  899 NAS aircraft and personnel; ten Corsair and ten Supermarine Seafires repesctively.

From November 1944 into 1945, she was engaged on aircraft ferry duties for British and US fleets. After the war she was used as troopship before return to the US.

From October 1945 to April 1946, her commanding officer was Capt. John Inglis, who was to become director of Naval Intelligence in July 1954.

Atheling put into Norfolk, Virginia, 6 December 1946 for return to the United States.  Her name was stricken from the Naval Register 7 February 1947 and she was sold to National Bulk Carriers as the merchant ship Roma 26 November 1947.  She was scrapped in Italy in November 1967.

Design and description
These ships were all larger and had a greater aircraft capacity than all the preceding American built escort carriers. They were also all laid down as escort carriers and not converted merchant ships.

Armament comprised: two 4 in/50, 5 in/38 or 5 in/51 Dual Purpose guns in single mounts, sixteen 40 mm Bofors anti-aircraft guns in twin mounts and twenty 20 mm Oerlikon anti-aircraft cannons in single mounts. They had a maximum aircraft capacity of twenty-four aircraft which could be a mixture of Grumman Martlet, Vought F4U Corsair or Hawker Sea Hurricane fighter aircraft and Fairey Swordfish or Grumman Avenger anti-submarine aircraft.

Notes

References

External links

HMS ATHELING (D 51) - Ruler-class Escort Aircraft Carrier

 

Ruler-class escort carriers
Ships built in Tacoma, Washington
1942 ships